The Tenth Annual Sebring International Grand Prix of Endurance for the Amoco Trophy took place on 26 March 1960, on the Sebring International Raceway, (Florida, United States).  It was the second round of the F.I.A. World Sports Car Championship. This was also the second round of the F.I.A. GT Cup.

Report

Entry

A massive total of 89 racing cars were registered for this event, of which 72 arrived for practice. Only these, 65 qualified for, and started the race. There was controversy surrounding the entry. The event promoter, Alec Ulmann had signed a deal with Amoco whereby they would be the fuel suppliers for the race. This prohibited any entrant from using any other brand of fuel.

This resulted in the works Ferrari and Porsche teams boycotting the event, as they had their own exclusive fuel arrangements with Shell Oil and British Petroleum (BP) respectively. However, these teams would still be represented in Florida. For Ferrari, their sent cars to Luigi Chinetti, who entered the cars under the North American Racing Team (NART) banner and thereby as a private entry and not bound by any agreement between Scuderia Ferrari and Shell. As for Porsche, they ‘leased’ two of their new RS 60 Spyders to the works driver, Jo Bonnier. Together with a number of Porsche drivers and mechanics who just happened to be holidaying in Florida at that time, volunteered they services to Bonnier for the event.

There was also controversy when the F.I.A.  made last minute rules changes concerning the luggage compartments and windscreens on the Grand Touring (GT) cars. The FIA ruled that these cars should be racing closer the factory specifications than some actually where. This caused some problems for the smaller cars like the Oscas.

Qualifying

As was the normal for Sebring and because there was no qualifying sessions to set the grid, the starting positions were decided according to engine size with the 5.0 litre Chevrolet Corvette C1 of Briggs Cunningham and John Fitch being given first place.

Race

Most of the 50,000 spectators expected Stirling Moss to win the race in his ”Birdcage” Maserati Tipo 61, provided the car lasted the distance. Of the 65 cars that qualified, many looked strange due to the hasty modifications placed on them with the new F.I.A. regulations.

Moss had a bad start due to his Maserati having problems starting and pulled away in 23rd place, but by the second lap, the Englishman was up the second behind the early leader, the Ferrari of Pete Lovely. He would pass Lovely on the next lap.

On lap five, a tragic accident occurred at the hairpin. The Lotus Elite being driven by Jim Hughes suffered a brake failure and headed for the escape road, only to found a photographer standing here, complete with tripod. Hughes tried to avoid him, but rolled his little Lotus, striking the photographer and killing them both.

At the end of the first hour, Moss, partnered by Dan Gurney were leading from another Birdcage T61 of Walt Hansgen and Ed Crawford. The first of the NART Ferraris was in third, driven by Richie Ginther and Chuck Daigh. By the start of the ‘lunch’ hour, the Ferrari had moved into second.

On lap 84, the Porsche of Graham Hill parked up with a rod through the engine block, while around the same time, the Ginther/Daigh Ferrari pitted with steam pouring from under the bonnet. Shortly after, the T61 of Crawford ran wide at the hairpin and got struck in the sandbank. Crawford proceeded to dig his car free using his hands, taking almost two hours to do so. Despite their problems, the Ginther/Daigh Ferarri was still in second at the halfway point, albeit lapping 3 mph slower than Moss/Gurney. Now in third was the little Porsche of Hans Herrmann and Olivier Gendebien.

After completing 123 laps, the Ginther/Daigh Ferrari was withdrawn as it was leaking water and oil. Just 13 laps later, and the leaders were also out, retiring with transmission failure. With 3½ hours to run, the Herrmann/Gendebien Porsche found itself firmly in the lead with another Porsche in second, being piloted by Bob Holbert and Roy Schechter.

After 12 hours of racing, the Bonnier entered Porsche of Herrmann and Gendebien, won ahead of the similar Brumos Porsche of Holbert and Schechter. Car number 42, took an impressive victory, completing 196 laps, covering 1,019.2 miles after 12 hours of racing, averaging a speed of 84.927 mph. Second place went to the second Porsche, albeit nine lap adrift. The podium was complete by the Ferrari of Lovely and Jack Nethercutt who were a further lap behind.

Official Classification

Class Winners are in Bold text.

 Fastest Lap: Chuck Daigh, 3:18.14secs (94.479 mph)

Class Winners

Standings after the race

FIA World Sportscar Championship

 Note: Only the top five positions are included in this set of standings.

Championship points were awarded for the first six places in each race in the order of 8-6-4-3-2-1. Manufacturers were only awarded points for their highest finishing car with no points awarded for positions filled by additional cars. Only the best 3 results out of the 5 races could be retained by each manufacturer. Points earned but not counted towards the championship totals are listed within brackets in the above table.

References

Further reading

Alec Ulmann. The Sebring Story. Chilton Book Company. ASIN B0006CUAP2.

12 Hours of Sebring
Sebring
Sebring
Sebring
Sebring